General Foods Corporation was a company whose direct predecessor was established in the United States by Charles William Post as the Postum Cereal Company in 1895.

The company changed its name to "General Foods" in 1929, after several corporate acquisitions, by Marjorie Post after she inherited the established cereal business from her father C. W. Post. In November 1985, General Foods was acquired by Philip Morris Companies (now Altria Group, Inc.) for $5.6 billion, the largest non-oil acquisition to that time. In December 1988, Philip Morris acquired Kraft Foods Inc., and, in 1990, combined the two food companies as Kraft Foods. "General Foods" was dropped from the corporate name in 1995; a line of caffeinated hot beverage mixes continued to carry the General Foods International name until 2010.

History

Background 

General Foods background can be traced to the Post Cereal Company, founded by C. W. Post in 1895 in Battle Creek, Michigan.  Post was a patient at the Battle Creek Sanitarium (run by John Harvey Kellogg, brother of Kellogg Company founder Will Keith Kellogg), and was inspired by the diet there to start his food company (and become a rival to the Kellogg brothers, who sold their own breakfast cereals). Post invested $78 in his initial equipment and supplies and set up manufacturing in a barn on what was known as the 'Old Beardsley Farm'.  His first product was Postum, a "cereal beverage" alternative to coffee made from wheat and molasses. The first cereal, Grape-Nuts, was developed in 1897 followed by Elijah's Manna in 1904 which was renamed Post Toasties in 1908.

In 1907 Collier's Weekly published an article questioning the claim made in advertisements for Grape Nuts that it could cure appendicitis. C. W. Post responded with advertisements questioning the mental capacity of the article's author, and Collier's Weekly sued for libel. The case was heard in 1910, and Post was fined $50,000. The decision was overturned on appeal, but advertisements for Postum products stopped making such claims.

General Foods 

C.W. Post died in 1914, and his daughter Marjorie Merriweather Post took over the company. The Postum Cereals company, which went on with some acquisitions such as Jell-O (gelatin dessert) in 1925, Walter Baker & Company (chocolate) in 1927, Maxwell House (coffee) in 1928, and other food brands.

By far the most important acquisition of 1929 was of the frozen-food company owned by Clarence Birdseye, called "General Seafood Corporation". Birdseye (December 9, 1886 - October 7, 1956) was one of the most important entrepreneurs in the history of the food industry. Born in New York City, he became interested in the frozen preservation of food during the course of working as a fur trader in Labrador between 1912 and 1916. By 1923, he had developed a commercially viable process for quick-freezing foods using a belt mechanism, which he patented. In 1924, with backing from three investors, he formed the "General Seafoods Company", in Gloucester, Massachusetts, to produce frozen haddock fillets packed in plain cardboard boxes.

The founder's daughter, Marjorie Merriweather Post, was first to become excited about the prospects for the frozen foods business. In 1926, she had put into port at Gloucester on her yacht, Sea Cloud, and was served a luncheon meal which, she learned to her amazement, had been frozen six months before. Despite her enthusiasm, it took Post three years to convince Postum's management to acquire the company. Postum paid $10.75 million for a 51% interest and its partner, Goldman Sachs, paid $12.5 million for the other 49%. Following this acquisition, Postum, Inc changed its name to General Foods Corporation. Goldman sold its share back to General Foods in 1932, apparently at a slight loss.

Shortly after the acquisition, General Foods began test-marketing an expanded line of frozen foods, but the company quickly realized that a packaging process alone would not be sufficient to market frozen products in stores. To be sold, the packages had to be kept frozen while on display, so Birdseye engineers began development of a freezer cabinet designed specifically to hold frozen foods. The cabinet, which first appeared in 1934, required a great deal of space and electricity, which were not readily available in most grocery stores of the period. For those stores which could accommodate them, the payback was immediate. Housewives quickly realized that keeping packages of frozen food in the icebox could mean fresher meals and fewer trips to the market.

The company published a cook book in 1932, the General Foods Cook Book, dedicated "To the American homemaker". Five editions were published between 1932 and 1937. The book includes photographs (among which is "General Foods offers over twenty famous products for your well-stocked pantry shelf") and a subject index.

General Foods was acquired by Altria Group in 1985. In 1989, Altria merged General Foods with Kraft Foods Inc., which it had acquired in 1987, to form the "Kraft General Foods" division. The cereal brands of Nabisco were acquired in 1993. In 1995, Kraft General Foods was reorganized and renamed "Kraft Foods". On November 15, 2007, Kraft announced it would spin off Post Cereals and merge that business with Ralcorp Holdings. That merger was completed August 4, 2008, at which time the official name of the company became Post Foods, LLC.

Timeline of selected later events

 1953 - General Foods acquired Perkins Products Company, maker of Kool-Aid.
 1957 - The company introduced Tang, which became available nationally two years later.
 1959 - General Foods acquires Hostess Food Products.
 1964 - General Foods introduced Maxim, the first American brand of freeze-dried coffee.
 1968 - General Foods buys the Burger Chef fast-food chain.
 1969 - General Foods buys Rax Restaurants.
 1971 - General Foods acquired the maker of Gevalia.
 1978 - General Foods sells Rax Restaurants to Rac.
 1981 - General Foods acquires Oscar Mayer & Company.
 1990 - General Foods merged into Kraft Foods Inc.
 2012 - Kraft Foods Inc. renamed itself Mondelez International and spun out Kraft Foods into a separate company
 2015 - Kraft Foods merges with H.J. Heinz Company, formed Kraft Heinz.
 2015 - Mondelez International merged its coffee division with Douwe Egberts, formed JDE Peet's which now owns former General Foods' international coffee brands.

See also

 800 Westchester Avenue (former headquarters)

References

Food manufacturers of the United States
Breakfast cereal companies
Companies based in Battle Creek, Michigan
Defunct companies based in Michigan
Companies based in Westchester County, New York
Defunct companies based in New York (state)
American companies established in 1929
Food and drink companies established in 1929
Food and drink companies disestablished in 1995
1929 establishments in Michigan
1995 disestablishments in New York (state)
Altria Group subsidiaries
General Foods
Kraft Foods brands
Former components of the Dow Jones Industrial Average